Burrell may refer to:

Places
Burrell, former name of Burrel, California, United States
Burrell, variant spelling of Boorlo, the Noongar name for Perth, Western Australia
Burrell Boom, Belize
Burrell, California, United States
Burrell Township, Armstrong County, Pennsylvania, United States
Burrell Township, Decatur County, Iowa, United States
Burrell Township, Indiana County, Pennsylvania, United States
Langley Burrell, Wiltshire, England
Lower Burrell, Pennsylvania, United States
Upper Burrell Township, Westmoreland County, Pennsylvania, United States

People with the given name
Burrell Ellis (b. 1957), American politician, former county executive in Georgia
Burrell Smith, (b. 1955), American circuit designer
B. Clark Burchfiel, (b. 1934), American geologist

Other uses
Burrell (surname)
Burrell affair
Burrell baronets
Burrell Collection, Glasgow, Scotland, United Kingdom
Burrell College of Osteopathic Medicine, Las Cruces, NM, United States 

Burrell Communications Group, American advertising agency

Burrell School District, Pennsylvania, United States
Charles Burrell & Sons, British engineering company

See also
Burel (disambiguation)
Burrel (disambiguation)